The Triflers is a 1920 American drama film directed by Christy Cabanne and starring Edith Roberts, David Butler, and Forrest Stanley. It was released on January 12, 1920.

Plot

Cast list
 Edith Roberts as Janet Randall
 David Butler as Cassidy
 Forrest Stanley as Monte Moreville
 Benny Alexander as Rupert Holbrook
 Katherine Kirkham as Mrs. Holbrook
 Arthur Shirley as Mr. Holbrook
 Arthur Hoyt as Charles Lewiston
 Lillian Langdon as Janet's mother
 Frederick Vroom as Janet's father
 Nell Craig as Mrs. Whitaker

References

External links 
 
 
 

Films directed by Christy Cabanne
Universal Pictures films
American silent feature films
Silent American drama films
American black-and-white films
1920 drama films
1920 films
Films with screenplays by Joseph F. Poland
1920s English-language films
1920s American films